The 1992–93 NBA season was the Lakers' 45th season in the National Basketball Association, and 33rd in the city of Los Angeles. During the off-season, the Lakers signed free agent James Edwards, who won two championships with the Detroit Pistons. After playing in the Olympics, All-Star guard Magic Johnson attempted a comeback, but cut it short when other NBA players expressed fear of playing against him. Under new head coach Randy Pfund, the Lakers played around .500 for the first half of the season holding a 26–23 at the All-Star break. At midseason, Sam Perkins was traded to the Seattle SuperSonics in exchange for Benoit Benjamin and top draft pick Doug Christie. However, the Lakers struggled playing below .500 for  the remainder of the season, losing 11 of 12 games between March 17 and April 9, finishing fifth in the Pacific Division with a 39–43 record, their worst since 1974–75, but still qualified the playoffs as the #8 seed in the Western Conference.

Sedale Threatt led the team with 15.1 points, 6.9 assists and 1.7 steals per game, while James Worthy finished second on the team in scoring averaging 14.9 points per game, and Byron Scott provided them with 13.7 points per game. In addition, Vlade Divac averaged 12.8 points, 8.9 rebounds, 1.6 steals and 1.7 blocks per game, while A.C. Green contributed 12.8 points and 8.7 rebounds per game, Elden Campbell provided with 7.7 points and 1.3 blocks per game, and top draft pick Anthony Peeler contributed 10.4 points per game off the bench.

In the Western Conference First Round of the playoffs, the Lakers took a 2–0 series lead over regular season MVP Charles Barkley, and the top-seeded Phoenix Suns. However, they would lose the series in five games, losing Game 5 on the road in overtime, 112–104. The Suns would reach the NBA Finals, but would lose to the 2-time defending champion Chicago Bulls in six games.

Following the season, Green signed as a free agent with the Phoenix Suns, while Scott signed with the Indiana Pacers during the next season, and Benjamin was dealt to the New Jersey Nets.

Draft picks

Roster

Regular season

Season standings

z – clinched division title
y – clinched division title
x – clinched playoff spot

Record vs. opponents

Game log

Regular season

|- style="background:#cfc;"
| 1
| November 6
| @ L.A. Clippers
| W 114-112 (OT)
| Byron Scott (29)
| Sam Perkins (10)
| Sedale Threatt (11)
| Los Angeles Memorial Sports Arena15,989
| 1-0
|- style="background:#fcc;"
| 2
| November 8
| Sacramento
| L 114-121
| James Worthy (30)
| Elden Campbell (9)
| Sedale Threatt (9)
| Great Western Forum15,021
| 1-1
|- style="background:#cfc;"
| 3
| November 10
| @ Golden State
| W 107-106
| Sedale Threatt (26)
| Vlade Divac (10)
| Byron Scott (6)
| Oakland-Alameda County Coliseum Arena15,025
| 2-1
|- style="background:#fcc;"
| 4
| November 12
| @ Seattle
| L 102-114
| Sedale Threatt (25)
| Divac & Threatt (7)
| Sedale Threatt (8)
| Seattle Center Coliseum14,419
| 2-2
|- style="background:#fcc;"
| 5
| November 13
| L.A. Clippers
| L 98-124
| Divac & Scott (17)
| Sam Perkins (9)
| Sedale Threatt (5)
| Great Western Forum14,555
| 2-3
|- style="background:#cfc;"
| 6
| November 15
| Golden State
| W 105-102
| Sedale Threatt (24)
| Sam Perkins (9)
| Sedale Threatt (7)
| Great Western Forum13,941
| 3-3
|- style="background:#cfc;"
| 7
| November 20
| Chicago
| W 120-118 (OT)
| Sam Perkins (26)
| Sam Perkins (15)
| Threatt & Worthy (8)
| Great Western Forum17,505
| 4-3
|- style="background:#cfc;"
| 8
| November 22
| Denver
| W 119-107
| Sedale Threatt (32)
| Sam Perkins (9)
| Sedale Threatt (9)
| Great Western Forum13,841
| 5-3
|- style="background:#fcc;"
| 9
| November 25
| New Jersey
| L 98-100
| Tony Smith (17)
| Vlade Divac (14)
| Sedale Threatt (10)
| Great Western Forum13,860
| 5-4
|- style="background:#cfc;"
| 10
| November 27
| @ Portland
| W 98-90
| James Worthy (19)
| Sam Perkins (9)
| James Worthy (7)
| Memorial Coliseum12,888
| 6-4
|- style="background:#cfc;"
| 11
| November 29
| Dallas
| W 114-95
| Vlade Divac (20)
| A.C. Green (14)
| Sedale Threatt (6)
| Great Western Forum13,855
| 7-4

|- style="background:#fcc;"
| 12
| December 1
| @ Sacramento
| L 110-117
| Sedale Threatt (26)
| Vlade Divac (10)
| James Edwards (5)
| ARCO Arena17,317
| 7-5
|- style="background:#cfc;"
| 13
| December 3
| @ Houston
| W 95-89
| Sam Perkins (21)
| Sam Perkins (13)
| Sedale Threatt (7)
| The Summit10,902
| 8-5
|- style="background:#fcc;"
| 14
| December 4
| @ Phoenix
| L 93-103
| Sam Perkins (25)
| Vlade Divac (7)
| Vlade Divac (8)
| American West Arena19,023
| 8-6
|- style="background:#cfc;"
| 15
| December 6
| Minnesota
| W 107-85
| Sedale Threatt (19)
| Vlade Divac (12)
| Peeler & Threatt (5)
| Great Western Forum14,068
| 9-6
|- style="background:#cfc;"
| 16
| December 9
| Portland
| W 124-111
| Sedale Threatt (26)
| Sam Perkins (11)
| James Worthy (12)
| Great Western Forum15,133
| 10-6
|- style="background:#cfc;"
| 17
| December 11
| Washington
| W 118-93
| Sam Perkins (25)
| Vlade Divac (12)
| Sedale Threatt (8)
| Great Western Forum13,618
| 11-6
|- style="background:#cfc;"
| 18
| December 13
| Milwaukee
| W 114-96
| Anthony Peeler (21)
| A.C. Green (12)
| Sedale Threatt (9)
| Great Western Forum13,265
| 12-6
|- style="background:#cfc;"
| 19
| December 15
| @ San Antonio
| W 107-101
| Sedale Threatt (24)
| A.C. Green (8)
| Sedale Threatt (9)
| HemisFair Arena16,057
| 13-6
|- style="background:#fcc;"
| 20
| December 16
| @ Dallas
| L 95-102
| Sedale Threatt (23)
| Vlade Divac (9)
| James Worthy (6)
| Reunion Arena13,358
| 13-7
|- style="background:#fcc;"
| 21
| December 18
| Phoenix
| L 100-116
| Smith & Threatt (16)
| Vlade Divac (10)
| Sedale Threatt (5)
| Great Western Forum16,734
| 13-8
|- style="background:#cfc;"
| 22
| December 19
| @ Denver
| W 92-86
| Sedale Threatt (27)
| Vlade Divac (14)
| Sam Perkins (4)
| McNichols Sports Arena17,022
| 14-8
|- style="background:#fcc;"
| 23
| December 23
| Seattle
| L 79-80
| Peeler & Worthy (16)
| Vlade Divac (13)
| Sedale Threatt (5)
| Great Western Forum14,754
| 14-9
|- style="background:#fcc;"
| 24
| December 26
| San Antonio
| L 92-104
| James Edwards (16)
| Green & Smith (5)
| James Worthy (7)
| Great Western Forum17,505
| 14-10
|- style="background:#fcc;"
| 25
| December 28
| @ Miami
| L 96-107
| James Worthy (26)
| Divac & Perkins (7)
| Threatt & Worthy (5)
| Miami Arena15,008
| 14-11
|- style="background:#cfc;"
| 26
| December 30
| @ Orlando
| W 96-93
| Sam Perkins (21)
| Sedale Threatt (7)
| Sedale Threatt (11)
| Orlando Arena15,151
| 15-11

|- style="background:#fcc;"
| 27
| January 2
| @ Cleveland
| L 91-106
| Vlade Divac (18)
| Vlade Divac (15)
| Scott & Threatt (5)
| Richfield Coliseum20,273
| 15-12
|- style="background:#fcc;"
| 28
| January 3
| @ Milwaukee
| L 101-109
| Vlade Divac (21)
| Sam Perkins (15)
| Sedale Threatt (6)
| Bradley Center15,881
| 15-13
|- style="background:#cfc;"
| 29
| January 5
| @ Chicago
| W 91-88
| James Worthy (21)
| A.C. Green (15)
| Anthony Peeler (6)
| Chicago Stadium18,676
| 16-13
|- style="background:#cfc;"
| 30
| January 6
| @ Minnesota
| W 98-78
| A.C. Green (17)
| Divac & Green (9)
| Threatt & Worthy (7)
| Target Center18,494
| 17-13
|- style="background:#cfc;"
| 31
| January 8
| Sacramento
| W 93-90
| James Worthy (25)
| Vlade Divac (16)
| Sedale Threatt (10)
| Great Western Forum15,066
| 18-13
|- style="background:#fcc;"
| 32
| January 10
| Miami
| L 89-101
| Vlade Divac (24)
| Vlade Divac (12)
| Duane Cooper (5)
| Great Western Forum14,956
| 18-14
|- style="background:#fcc;"
| 33
| January 14
| @ L.A. Clippers
| L 102-105
| Sam Perkins (16)
| A.C. Green (10)
| Sedale Threatt (6)
| Los Angeles Memorial Sports Arena15,356
| 18-15
|- style="background:#cfc;"
| 34
| January 15
| Portland
| W 99-96
| Sedale Threatt (22)
| A.C. Green (13)
| Byron Scott (5)
| Great Western Forum17,505
| 19-15
|- style="background:#fcc;"
| 35
| January 18
| Houston
| L 90-110
| James Worthy (18)
| A.C. Green (11)
| Sedale Threatt (8)
| Great Western Forum15,489
| 19-16
|- style="background:#fcc;"
| 36
| January 20
| Seattle
| L 101-111
| Sedale Threatt (20)
| A.C. Green (12)
| Cooper & Threatt (5)
| Great Western Forum14,114
| 19-17
|- style="background:#fcc;"
| 37
| January 22
| @ Utah
| L 94-98
| Sam Perkins (19)
| A.C. Green (8)
| Threatt & Worthy (4)
| Delta Center19,911
| 19-18
|- style="background:#cfc;"
| 38
| January 24
| @ Washington
| W 112-110 (OT)
| James Worthy (25)
| A.C. Green (15)
| Sam Perkins (10)
| Capital Centre14,704
| 20-18
|- style="background:#fcc;"
| 39
| January 26
| @ New Jersey
| L 91-106
| James Worthy (22)
| Sam Perkins (11)
| Sedale Threatt (4)
| Brendan Byrne Arena16,467
| 20-19
|- style="background:#fcc;"
| 40
| January 28
| @ Indiana
| L 110-127
| Anthony Peeler (25)
| Vlade Divac (12)
| Sedale Threatt (6)
| Market Square Arena13,085
| 20-20
|- style="background:#cfc;"
| 41
| January 29
| @ Charlotte
| W 123-108
| Byron Scott (27)
| Vlade Divac (8)
| Sedale Threatt (10)
| Charlotte Coliseum23,698
| 21-20
|- style="background:#cfc;"
| 42
| January 31
| @ Boston
| W 96-87
| Peeler & Threatt (16)
| A.C. Green (12)
| Sedale Threatt (7)
| Boston Garden14,890
| 22-20

|- style="background:#fcc;"
| 43
| February 2
| Orlando
| L 97-110
| Anthony Peeler (24)
| A.C. Green (12)
| Sedale Threatt (8)
| Great Western Forum17,505
| 22-21
|- style="background:#cfc;"
| 44
| February 4
| Utah
| W 114-110
| A.C. Green (23)
| A.C. Green (11)
| James Worthy (7)
| Great Western Forum14,629
| 23-21
|- style="background:#fcc;"
| 45
| February 5
| @ Phoenix
| L 104-132
| A.C. Green (20)
| A.C. Green (15)
| Sedale Threatt (6)
| American West Arena19,023
| 23-22
|- style="background:#cfc;"
| 46
| February 8
| Dallas
| W 108-100 (OT)
| Byron Scott (26)
| Sam Perkins (17)
| Sedale Threatt (8)
| Great Western Forum14,202
| 24-22
|- style="background:#cfc;"
| 47
| February 10
| Denver
| W 111-102
| James Worthy (21)
| Sam Perkins (10)
| Sedale Threatt (7)
| Great Western Forum14,351
| 25-22
|- style="background:#cfc;"
| 48
| February 14
| Atlanta
| W 135-96
| Byron Scott (24)
| Vlade Divac (13)
| Duane Cooper (11)
| Great Western Forum16,219
| 26-22
|- style="background:#fcc;"
| 49
| February 18
| @ Portland
| L 103-105
| James Worthy (26)
| A.C. Green (10)
| Byron Scott (7)
| Memorial Coliseum12,888
| 26-23
|- align="center"
|colspan="9" bgcolor="#bbcaff"|All-Star Break
|- style="background:#cfc;"
|- bgcolor="#bbffbb"
|- style="background:#cfc;"
| 50
| February 24
| @ Sacramento
| W 104-99
| Sedale Threatt (23)
| A.C. Green (15)
| Sedale Threatt (11)
| ARCO Arena17,317
| 27-23
|- style="background:#fcc;"
| 51
| February 26
| Cleveland
| L 102-114
| James Worthy (23)
| A.C. Green (10)
| Sedale Threatt (12)
| Great Western Forum16,054
| 27-24
|- style="background:#cfc;"
| 52
| February 28
| L.A. Clippers
| W 124-112
| A.C. Green (30)
| Vlade Divac (12)
| Sedale Threatt (13)
| Great Western Forum16,895
| 28-24

|- style="background:#fcc;"
| 53
| March 2
| @ Denver
| L 115-127
| Sedale Threatt (25)
| A.C. Green (13)
| Sedale Threatt (7)
| McNichols Sports Arena17,022
| 28-25
|- style="background:#cfc;"
| 54
| March 3
| @ Golden State
| W 117-111
| A.C. Green (24)
| A.C. Green (11)
| Sedale Threatt (10)
| Oakland-Alameda County Coliseum Arena15,025
| 29-25
|- style="background:#cfc;"
| 55
| March 5
| Philadelphia
| W 101-97 (OT)
| Byron Scott (22)
| Vlade Divac (21)
| Sedale Threatt (10)
| Great Western Forum14,531
| 30-25
|- style="background:#fcc;"
| 56
| March 7
| Charlotte
| L 101-105
| James Worthy (25)
| A.C. Green (13)
| Sedale Threatt (10)
| Great Western Forum16,989
| 30-26
|- style="background:#cfc;"
| 57
| March 9
| @ Detroit
| W 123-121
| James Worthy (28)
| A.C. Green (17)
| Sedale Threatt (15)
| The Palace of Auburn Hills21,454
| 31-26
|- style="background:#fcc;"
| 58
| March 10
| @ New York
| L 104-110
| A.C. Green (22)
| Vlade Divac (14)
| Divac & Threatt (5)
| Madison Square Garden19,763
| 31-27
|- style="background:#cfc;"
| 59
| March 12
| @ Philadelphia
| W 101-95
| Vlade Divac (20)
| Vlade Divac (12)
| Sedale Threatt (8)
| The Spectrum16,126
| 32-27
|- style="background:#fcc;"
| 60
| March 14
| @ Atlanta
| L 107-117
| James Worthy (25)
| A.C. Green (13)
| Sedale Threatt (6)
| Omni Coliseum13,628
| 32-28
|- style="background:#cfc;"
| 61
| March 15
| @ San Antonio
| W 92-87
| James Worthy (24)
| Vlade Divac (12)
| Scott & Threatt (5)
| HemisFair Arena16,057
| 33-28
|- style="background:#fcc;"
| 62
| March 17
| San Antonio
| L 100-101
| Vlade Divac (23)
| Vlade Divac (9)
| Sedale Threatt (10)
| Great Western Forum15,000
| 33-29
|- style="background:#fcc;"
| 63
| March 19
| Boston
| L 119-129
| Byron Scott (20)
| Divac & Green (9)
| Sedale Threatt (11)
| Great Western Forum17,505
| 33-30
|- style="background:#fcc;"
| 64
| March 21
| Detroit
| L 101-106
| Vlade Divac (28)
| Vlade Divac (12)
| Sedale Threatt (6)
| Great Western Forum15,923
| 33-31
|- style="background:#fcc;"
| 65
| March 24
| Phoenix
| L 105-120
| James Worthy (16)
| Divac & Green (8)
| Sedale Threatt (11)
| Great Western Forum17,505
| 33-32
|- style="background:#fcc;"
| 66
| March 26
| New York
| L 95-105
| Byron Scott (18)
| Elden Campbell (12)
| Sedale Threatt (6)
| Great Western Forum17,505
| 33-33
|- style="background:#cfc;"
| 67
| March 28
| Indiana
| W 92-90
| Campbell & Divac (18)
| Vlade Divac (13)
| Vlade Divac (6)
| Great Western Forum15,747
| 34-33
|- style="background:#fcc;"
| 68
| March 30
| @ L.A. Clippers
| L 93-101
| A.C. Green (22)
| Vlade Divac (12)
| Sedale Threatt (8)
| Los Angeles Memorial Sports Arena14,274
| 34-34
|- style="background:#fcc;"
| 69
| March 31
| Minnesota
| L 113-126
| Sedale Threatt (22)
| A.C. Green (11)
| Sedale Threatt (7)
| Great Western Forum15,350
| 34-35

|- style="background:#fcc;"
| 70
| April 4
| Utah
| L 99-111
| Anthony Peeler (19)
| Vlade Divac (10)
| Sedale Threatt (8)
| Great Western Forum15,593
| 34-36
|- style="background:#fcc;"
| 71
| April 6
| @ Phoenix
| L 114-115
| Elden Campbell (21)
| A.C. Green (13)
| Duane Cooper (4)
| American West Arena19,023
| 34-37
|- style="background:#fcc;"
| 72
| April 8
| @ Golden State
| L 116-122 (OT)
| Byron Scott (24)
| Vlade Divac (9)
| Sedale Threatt (9)
| Oakland-Alameda County Coliseum Arena15,025
| 34-38
|- style="background:#fcc;"
| 73
| April 9
| Portland
| L 105-109
| James Worthy (26)
| Vlade Divac (17)
| Anthony Peeler (8)
| Great Western Forum15,956
| 34-39
|- style="background:#cfc;"
| 74
| April 11
| Seattle
| W 98-96
| Sedale Threatt (25)
| A.C. Green (11)
| James Worthy (9)
| Great Western Forum14,915
| 35-39
|- style="background:#fcc;"
| 75
| April 13
| @ Houston
| L 107-126
| Vlade Divac (18)
| Vlade Divac (13)
| Vlade Divac (5)
| The Summit16,611
| 35-40
|- style="background:#cfc;"
| 76
| April 14
| @ Dallas
| W 112-99
| Sedale Threatt (22)
| Vlade Divac (12)
| Sedale Threatt (5)
| Reunion Arena16,064
| 36-40
|- style="background:#fcc;"
| 77
| April 16
| Houston
| L 84-100
| Christie & Peeler (15)
| Vlade Divac (13)
| Sedale Threatt (7)
| Great Western Forum15,187
| 36-41
|- style="background:#cfc;"
| 78
| April 18
| Golden State
| W 115-112
| Green & Worthy (22)
| A.C. Green (14)
| Sedale Threatt (11)
| Great Western Forum14,827
| 37-41
|- style="background:#cfc;"
| 79
| April 20
| @ Minnesota
| W 107-95
| A.C. Green (20)
| Vlade Divac (10)
| Sedale Threatt (6)
| Target Center19,006
| 38-41
|- style="background:#fcc;"
| 80
| April 21
| @ Utah
| L 102-113
| Benoit Benjamin (17)
| Campbell & Christie (8)
| Byron Scott (7)
| Delta Center19,911
| 38-42
|- style="background:#fcc;"
| 81
| April 23
| @ Seattle
| L 93-122
| Tony Smith (18)
| Elden Campbell (8)
| Duane Cooper (7)
| Seattle Center Coliseum14,691
| 38-43
|- style="background:#cfc;"
| 82
| April 24
| Sacramento
| W 125-107
| A.C. Green (26)
| A.C. Green (11)
| Sedale Threatt (12)
| Great Western Forum16,482
| 39-43

Playoffs

|- style="background:#cfc;"
| 1
| April 30
| @ Phoenix
| W 107–103
| Sedale Threatt (35)
| Vlade Divac (10)
| Sedale Threatt (7)
| America West Arena19,023
| 1–0
|- style="background:#cfc;"
| 2
| May 2
| @ Phoenix
| W 86–81
| Vlade Divac (19)
| Divac & Green (13)
| Sedale Threatt (8)
| America West Arena19,023
| 2–0
|- style="background:#fcc;"
| 3
| May 4
| Phoenix
| L 102–107
| Vlade Divac (30)
| A.C. Green (17)
| Sedale Threatt (10)
| Great Western Forum17,505
| 2–1
|- style="background:#fcc;"
| 4
| May 6
| Phoenix
| L 86–101
| Vlade Divac (17)
| A.C. Green (15)
| Sedale Threatt (6)
| Great Western Forum17,505
| 2–2
|- style="background:#fcc;"
| 5
| May 9
| @ Phoenix
| L 104–112 (OT)
| James Worthy (24)
| A.C. Green (19)
| Sedale Threatt (9)
| America West Arena19,023
| 2–3

Player statistics

NOTE: Please write the players statistics in alphabetical order by last name.

Season

Playoffs

Awards and records

Transactions

References

Los Angeles Lakers seasons
Los Angle
Los Angle
Los Angle